The Molen van Schoonoord  is a smock mill in Schoonoord, Netherlands. The mill was built in 1903 and is listed as a Rijksmonument, number 33784. It is now used as living accommodation.

History
A mill was built here in 1854. It stood until it was severely damaged in a storm in 1903, when the cap and sails were blown off. To replace it, a mill was moved here in 1903, having previously been used as an oil mill in Middelstum, Groningen, under the name Molen van Faber. The mill was built for J S de Vries. The mill was repaired in 1937 by millwright Christiaan Bremer of Adorp, Groningen. In 1946, Sails with leading edges streamlined using the Van Bussel system were fitted. The mill was working until 1952, and then stood idle. The mill was dismantled in 1978, the cap surviving alongside the mill. The smock survives to its full height, retaining the stage. The mill is used as living accommodation.

Description

The Molen van Schoonoord is what the Dutch describe as an "achtkante stellingmolen". It is a two-storey smock mill with a stage on a three-storey brick base. The smock is thatched. The mill was winded by a tailpole and winch. The mill drove a single pair of millstones.

Millers
J S de Vries (1903- )
Anne Bos
W Wiertsema
W F Hindriks
H van den Berg

Reference for above:-

References

Windmills in Drenthe
Smock mills in the Netherlands
Windmills completed in 1903
Rijksmonuments in Drenthe
Octagonal buildings in the Netherlands
Coevorden